Davallia mariesii, the squirrel's foot fern, is a species of epiphytic fern native to Japan and eastern Asia. In cultivation it is used as groundcover in moist, shady areas.

This plant has gained the Royal Horticultural Society's Award of Garden Merit.

References

Davalliaceae
Flora of China
Flora of Eastern Asia